Martin Faranan McDonagh (born 26 March 1970) is a British-Irish playwright and filmmaker. He is known for his absurdist black humour which often challenges the modern theatre aesthetic. He has received numerous accolades including an Academy Award, six BAFTA Awards, four Golden Globe Awards, three Olivier Awards, and nominations for five Tony Awards.

He started his career in the Royal National Theatre with The Pillowman in 2003. He has since written many plays which have been produced on the West End and on Broadway. His acclaimed plays include The Beauty Queen of Leenane (1996), The Cripple of Inishmaan (1996), The Lonesome West (1997), The Lieutenant of Inishmore (2001), A Behanding in Spokane (2010), and Hangmen (2015).
 
McDonagh won the Academy Award for Best Live Action Short Film for Six Shooter in 2004 and has received nominations for six other Academy Awards. He directed the dark comedy films In Bruges (2008), Seven Psychopaths (2012), Three Billboards Outside Ebbing, Missouri (2017), and The Banshees of Inisherin (2022).

Early life
McDonagh was born on 26 March 1970 in Camberwell, London, to Irish parents. His mother (originally from Killeenduff, Easky, County Sligo) and his father (originally from Leitir Mealláin, Connemara, County Galway) moved back to Galway in 1992, but McDonagh and his brother (writer-director John Michael McDonagh) stayed in London.

Career

Theatre
Separated into two trilogies, McDonagh's first six plays are located in and around County Galway, where he spent his holidays as a child. The first is set in Leenane, a small village on the west coast of Ireland, and consists of The Beauty Queen of Leenane (1996), A Skull in Connemara (1997) and The Lonesome West (1997). His second trilogy is set across the Aran Islands, off the coast of County Galway, and consists of The Cripple of Inishmaan (1996), The Lieutenant of Inishmore (2001), and The Banshees of Inisheer. The third play was never published, as McDonagh insisted it "isn't any good", though he expressed a desire to return to it when he is older. In 2022, McDonagh directed a film titled The Banshees of Inisherin. The screenplay's resemblance to the play is unclear.

In 1999 he was one of the recipients of the V Europe Prize Theatrical Realities awarded to the Royal Court Theatre (with Sarah Kane, Mark Ravenhill, Jez Butterworth, Conor McPherson).

McDonagh's first non-Irish play, The Pillowman, is set in a fictitious totalitarian state and premiered at the Royal National Theatre in 2003, after a reading at the Finborough Theatre in 1995.

A Behanding in Spokane is McDonagh's first play that is set in the United States and it premiered on Broadway in March 2010. Lead actor Christopher Walken was nominated for a Tony Award for Best Actor in a Play for his performance as a killer looking for the hand he lost in his youth.

McDonagh also penned two prize-winning radio plays, one of which is The Tale of the Wolf and the Woodcutter.

In February 2010, an announcement revealed that McDonagh was working on a new stage musical with composer Tom Waits and director Robert Wilson.

The Leenane Trilogy
The trilogy starts off with The Beauty Queen of Leenane, which is the story of the dysfunctional relationship between a spinster and her domineering mother, during the course of which the former faces her last chance at love, and the latter faces a rather grim end. The play was well received on its opening night in Galway in 1996 and was next produced Off-Broadway at the Atlantic Theater Company in 1998. The play transferred to Broadway in April 1998 and was nominated for a Tony Award for Best Play.

The second part of the trilogy, A Skull in Connemara, involves a Connemara man who is employed to exhume skeletons in an overcrowded graveyard and he encounters the wife whom he was once accused of killing. The play premiered in 1997 at Town Hall Theatre, Galway. The play was presented at the Royal Court Theatre (London), and made its US premiere at the A Contemporary Theatre (ACT) in Seattle, Washington in July to August 2000. The play ran Off-Broadway in January to May 2001 at the Gramercy Theatre, produced by the Roundabout Theatre.

The final part is titled The Lonesome West, a play involving two brothers bickering in the aftermath of the supposedly accidental fatal shooting of their father. The play ran on Broadway in 1999 and received a Tony Award nomination for Best Play in 1999.

The Aran Islands Trilogy
The Cripple of Inishmaan is a dark comedy in which a crippled teenager schemes to attain a role in Man of Aran. The play opened in 1997 at the Royal National Theatre (Cottesloe) in London. It opened in April 1998 Off-Broadway at the Joseph Papp Public Theater, with Ruaidhri Conroy in the title role on both occasions. Also in 1998, Frederick Koehler played the title role in the Geffen Playhouse production in Los Angeles, California. In December 2008, The Cripple of Inishmaan was produced Off-Broadway by the Atlantic Theater Company, in conjunction with The Druid Theatre Company of Galway, Ireland.

The Lieutenant of Inishmore is the followup play which was written as a response to the 1993 Warrington bombings when two children were killed by the IRA.  It is a dark comedy in which the insane leader of an INLA (Irish National Liberation Army) splinter group discovers that his best friend, a cat, has been killed. The play was produced Off-Broadway in February 2006 by the Atlantic Theater Company. It transferred to Broadway in May 2006 and received a 2006 Tony Award nomination for Best Play.

The Banshees of Inisheer, the third play of the trilogy, was not produced. It is unclear how close the 2022 McDonagh-directed film The Banshees of Inisherin comes to the original material. The film's screenplay was published in 2022.

Other plays
The Pillowman

A writer in a non-specified totalitarian state is interrogated over the content of several of his Brothers Grimm-style short stories. The play was awarded the Laurence Olivier Award for Best New Play in 2004 and received a 2005 Tony Award nomination for Best Play.

A Behanding in Spokane

A play in which the character of Carmichael has been searching for his missing left hand for a quarter of a century. The play opened on Broadway in March 2010. The play was nominated for the 2010 Drama League award, Distinguished Production of a Play.

Hangmen

A play following Harry Wade, England's second-best hangman, after the abolition of hanging in Great Britain in 1965. The play premiered at the Royal Court Theatre, London, in September 2015. The play was awarded the Laurence Olivier Award for Best New Play in 2016. In 2020, Hangmen briefly premiered on Broadway at the John Golden Theatre starring Mark Addy and Dan Stevens before being shut down due to the COVID-19 pandemic. The play returned on Broadway in 2022 this time with David Threlfall and Alfie Allen. The play received critical acclaim from critics including from The New York Times theatre critic Jesse Green who wrote, "[Hangmen] feels like a perfect fit for our unjust times".

A Very Very Very Dark Matter

A play set in a townhouse in Copenhagen that reveals the dark source of the tales of children's author Hans Christian Andersen, as well as of the writer Charles Dickens. It premiered at the Bridge Theatre, London in October 2018.

Film
McDonagh has stated that he prefers writing films to plays, as he holds a "respect for the whole history of films and a slight disrespect for theatre." In a 1998 conversation with Irish drama critic Fintan O'Toole in BOMB magazine, McDonagh further explained, 
It's not that I don't respect theatre. I'm intelligent enough to know that a play can completely inspire a person as much as a film...[but] theatre isn't something that's connected to me, from a personal point of view, I can't appreciate what I'm doing.In an interview in 2005, the New York Times writer observed that McDonagh "now seems more comfortably resigned to the storytelling powers of drama, if still dismissive of its inherent elitism. 'It's kind of weird working in an art form that's not, well ...,' he stops and starts again. 'It's strange to be working in an art form that costs $100 to participate in.'" In an interview with Sean O'Hagan of The Guardian, McDonagh said theatre "is never going to be edgy in the way I want it to be", when discussing his absence from London theatre and promoting his new play Hangmen.

2000s 
In 2006, McDonagh won an Academy Award for his short film Six Shooter (2004), which is his first film that he wrote and directed. Six Shooter is a black comedy (as are his plays) that features Brendan Gleeson, Rúaidhrí Conroy, David Wilmot and Aisling O'Sullivan. It was shot on location in Wicklow, Waterford and Rosslare. In the short film, Gleeson's character encounters a strange, and possibly psychotic, young man during a train journey homeward following his wife's death.

McDonagh entered into an agreement with the Focus Features film production company to direct In Bruges, a feature-length film based on his own screenplay. Two Irish hitmen hide in the Flemish city of Bruges after a problematic job. Released in the US in 2008, the film features Colin Farrell, Ralph Fiennes and Brendan Gleeson. In Bruges was the Opening Night film for the 2008 Sundance Festival and the Jameson Dublin International Film Festival, and McDonagh received a nomination for Best Original Screenplay at the 81st Academy Awards.

2010s 
In a 2008 interview with Stop Smiling magazine, McDonagh said, "I've got a couple of film scripts that are ready to go. I'm not going to do anything with them for a couple of years, until I've travelled and had some fun. But there's one called Seven Psychopaths; if I do another film, that'll be it. I hope you like it." The production of the film was confirmed in May 2011 and it was eventually released in North America on 12 October 2012. Colin Farrell, Sam Rockwell, Woody Harrelson, Christopher Walken, and Tom Waits star in the film.

McDonagh wrote and directed his drama-dark film Three Billboards Outside Ebbing, Missouri (2017), starring Frances McDormand, Woody Harrelson, and Sam Rockwell, which premiered at the Venice Film Festival on 4 September and won the People's Choice Award at the Toronto International Film Festival on 17 September 2017. Three Billboards won four awards at the 2017 Golden Globes, including Best Screenplay for McDonagh. McDonagh received Academy Award nominations for Best Picture and Best Original Screenplay for the film.

2020s 
Production of McDonagh's next film project was announced in 2020, titled The Banshees of Inisherin, with Brendan Gleeson and Colin Farrell in the lead roles. Production was delayed by COVID-19, but shooting started in August 2021 and wrapped on 23 October 2021. The movie held its world premiere at the 79th Venice International Film Festival on 5 September 2022 and had a limited theatrical release on 21 October 2022.  McDonagh was awarded Best Original Screenplay at the 80th Golden Globe Awards, where the film also won Best Comedy/Musical.

Personal life
Since 2018, McDonagh has been in a relationship with actress and writer Phoebe Waller-Bridge. He is a vegetarian.

McDonagh currently resides in East London.

McDonagh holds dual citizenship for both Ireland and the United Kingdom. The west of Ireland is a reoccurring setting for him: his first six plays (including The Beauty Queen of Leenane and The Cripple of Inishmaan) are located in or around County Galway, where he spent a significant part of his childhood.

Plays 
 The Beauty Queen of Leenane (1996)
 The Cripple of Inishmaan (1996)
 A Skull in Connemara (1997)
 The Lonesome West (1997)
 The Lieutenant of Inishmore (2001)
 The Banshees of Inisheer (unproduced)
 The Pillowman (2003)
 A Behanding in Spokane (2010)
 Hangmen (2015)
 A Very Very Very Dark Matter (2018)

Filmography
Film

Short film
 Six Shooter (2004)

Executive producer
 The Second Death (2000)
 The Guard (2011)

Awards and nominations

Directed Oscar-nominated performances

References

External links
 
 

1970 births
Living people
People from Camberwell
Directors of Live Action Short Film Academy Award winners
20th-century British dramatists and playwrights
21st-century British dramatists and playwrights
British people of Irish descent
20th-century British screenwriters
21st-century British screenwriters
British male screenwriters
British male dramatists and playwrights
Filmmakers who won the Best Film BAFTA Award
Film directors from London
Writers from London
Best Original Screenplay BAFTA Award winners
Best Screenplay Golden Globe winners
Best Screenplay AACTA International Award winners
Golden Globe Award-winning producers